State Road 421 (SR 421) is a major thoroughfare that runs east–west through Port Orange, Florida from Interstate 95 (I-95) east to U.S. Route 1 (US 1) where it turns into SR A1A.

Taylor Road continues west as County Road 421 (CR 421) to CR 415 (Tomoka Farms Road).

Major intersections

References

External links

421
421
0421